Sumayela Ndebele, Northern Transvaal Ndebele or siNdebele is a Bantu language of South Africa. It is spoken northeast of Southern Ndebele.

References 

Languages of South Africa
Nguni languages